David Sabatini may refer to:

 David D. Sabatini, Argentine-American cell biologist and professor emeritus at New York University
 David M. Sabatini (born 1968), American cell biologist, professor at MIT, David D. Sabatini's son